Micrurus ibiboboca, the caatinga coral snake, is a coral snake in the family Elapidae. It occurs in eastern Brazil, south of the Amazon.

Micrurus ibiboboca is often confused with the widespread species Micrurus lemniscatus.

References

ibiboboca
Snakes of South America
Reptiles of Brazil
Endemic fauna of Brazil
Fauna of the Caatinga
Reptiles described in 1820